Falmouth station is a bus station and former railroad station in Falmouth, Massachusetts. Built in 1912 to replace an older station, it was used for rail service until 1964, with brief revivals in 1984 and 1988.

History

The original station in Falmouth was placed in service in 1872 when the Old Colony Railroad inaugurated service on the Woods Hole branch.

In 1912 the original station was sold to the Swift family who moved it across the tracks.  In its place the New Haven Railroad built a replacement brick station, which stands to this day. It served daily year-round New Haven RR trains to Boston until 1959. Summertime service continued to 1964. The station was also a stop for day and nighttime versions of the NH's Cape Codder service to New York City; these trains were among the trains terminated in 1964.

Failed passenger service proposals

The Cape Cod and Hyannis Railroad served the station briefly in 1984, and again in 1988. In 1989, a mini-high level platform was built when commuter service was proposed by the Commonwealth of Massachusetts in order to ease traffic congestion in the seasonally popular town.

Falmouth rail service remained a hotly debated topic for nearly two decades, as the housing boom of the 1990s and 2000s took hold.  With a new platform in Falmouth that never saw a passenger, resumption of passenger and freight service was promised by the commonwealth.  However, pro-rail trail advocates wielded considerable political influence with State Representative Eric Turkington, who passed legislation before leaving office in 2008 that provided funding for the extension of the rail trail to North Falmouth.  In June 2008, the line was cut back to North Falmouth and replaced with an extension of the existing bike path. Additionally, this cut off any possibility of restoration of service to Woods Hole Railroad Station, the traditional final station of the north-south branch from Bourne on the west side of the Cape.

The former Falmouth railroad station today is used as a bus depot by the Cape Cod Regional Transit Authority and Peter Pan Bus Lines.  The rail line that once carried trains to the station has today been converted into a bike path which is known as the Shining Sea Bikeway.

References

External links

Falmouth, Massachusetts
Old Colony Railroad Stations on Cape Cod
Former railway stations in Massachusetts
Repurposed railway stations in the United States
Bus stations in Massachusetts
Transportation buildings and structures in Barnstable County, Massachusetts
Railway stations in the United States opened in 1872
Railway stations closed in 1988